The Padma Bhushan is the third-highest civilian award of the Republic of India. Instituted on 2January 1954, the award is given for "distinguished service of a high order", without distinction of race, occupation, position, or sex. The recipients receive a Sanad, a certificate signed by the President of India and a circular-shaped medallion with no monetary association. The recipients are announced every year on Republic Day (26January) and registered in The Gazette of Indiaa publication used for official government notices and released weekly by the Department of Publication, under the Ministry of Urban Development. The conferral of the award is not considered official without its publication in the Gazette. The name of a recipient, whose award has been revoked or restored, both of which require the authority of the President, is  archived and they are required to surrender their medal when their name is struck from the register. , none of the conferments of Padma Bhushan during the 2010s have been revoked or restored. The recommendations are received from all the state and the union territory governments, as well as from Ministries of the Government of India, the Bharat Ratna and the Padma Vibhushan awardees, the Institutes of Excellence, the Ministers, the Chief Ministers and the Governors of State, and the Members of Parliament including private individuals.

When instituted in 1954, the Padma Bhushan was classified as "Dusra Varg" (Class II) under the three-tier Padma Vibhushan awards, which were preceded by the Bharat Ratna in hierarchy. On 15January 1955, the Padma Vibhushan was reclassified into three different awards as the Padma Vibhushan, the Padma Bhushan and the Padma Shri. The criteria included "distinguished service of a high order in any field including service rendered by Government servants", but excluded those working with the public sector undertakings with the exception of doctors and scientists. The 1954 statutes did not allow posthumous awards; this was subsequently modified in the January 1955 statute. The centrally placed pattern made of outer lines of a square of  side is embossed with a knob carved within each of the outer angles of the pattern. A raised circular space of diameter  is placed at the centre of the decoration. A centrally located lotus flower is embossed on the obverse side of the medal and the text "Padma" is placed above and the text "Bhushan" is placed below the lotus written in Devanagari script. The State Emblem of India is displayed in the centre of the reverse side, together with the national motto of India, "Satyameva Jayate" (Truth alone triumphs) in Devanagari script, which is inscribed on the lower edge. The rim, the edges and all embossing on either side is of standard gold with the text "Padma Bhushan" of gold gilt. The medal is suspended by a pink riband  in width with a broad white stripe in the middle. It is ranked fifth in the order of precedence of wearing of medals and decorations of the Indian civilian and military awards.

, a total of 218 individuals have been conferred with the award in 2010s forty-three conferments were presented in 2010, followed by thirty-one in 2011, twenty-eight in 2012, twenty-three in 2013, twenty-four in 2014, twenty in 2015, nineteen in 2016, seven in 2017, nine in 2018, and fourteen in 2019. Since 2010, the Padma Bhushan have been conferred upon thirty foreign recipients twenty from the United States, three from the United Kingdom, and one each from Bangladesh, Germany, Ireland, Russia, Singapore, South Africa, and Thailand. Individuals from ten different fields were awarded, which includes sixty artists, thirty-five from literature and education, twenty-four from science and engineering, twenty-one from trade and industry, eighteen from medicine, fifteen civil servants, seventeen from public affairs, ten sportspersons, eight from social work, and eleven from other fields. Most recently on 25 January 2019, the award has been bestowed upon fourteen recipients.

Recipients

Controversies and refusals

The 2010 conferment on an Indian-American businessman Sant Singh Chatwal created much controversy. Awarded in the field of Public Affairs, Chatwal is known for his association with former US President Bill Clinton and his wife Hillary Clinton and pled guilty to violating the Federal Election Campaign Act and witness tampering during the United States presidential election. He was also accused of lobbying for the award by leveraging his contacts in the Prime Minister's Office (PMO) and United States Congress. The Government of India, however, issued a press release defending the conferment. The statement mentioned Chatwal as a "tireless advocate" of the country's interest in the United States. It also clarified that out of five Central Bureau of Investigation (CBI) registered cases against him between 1992 and 1994, three were closed by CBI itself and in remaining two cases, Chatwal was discharged by the Court and as per the reports that were made available to the selection committee, there was "nothing adverse on record against him". According to media reports, there were several cases filed or registered after April 2009 which includes three criminal complaints with Kerala Police and four cases in Delhi High Court and Kerala High Court. Chatwal also served summons in January 2010. However, the then Union Home Secretary Gopal Krishna Pillai said that "no probe has been ordered nor any report sought from anyone".

Earlier in 2008, Chatwal was considered for the Padma Shri but the Indian Embassy in Washington, D.C. declined to nominate Chatwal when asked by the PMO. Ronen Sen, who was then serving as the Indian Ambassador to the United States, had told the PMO that the conferral would not be appropriate because of the controversy associated with Chatwal's financial dealings in two countries. Sen had also mentioned that though positive, Chatwal's contribution are much less compared to other Indian-Americans and the bestowal would not only "demoralise the others who had done much more" but also would create "the impression that India did not regard lack of transparency in financial dealings as a disqualification for its highest honours".

In 2013, playback singer S. Janaki refused to accept her award and stated that "the award has come late in her five-and-half-decade long career". The singer also mentioned that she is not against the Government and expressed happiness for the recognition but requested the Government to "show some more consideration to the artists from the southern parts of the country". In 2014, family members of J. S. Verma who served as 27th Chief Justice of India refused the posthumous conferral stating that "Verma himself would not have accepted" the honour as he "never hankered or lobbied for any acclaim, reward or favour".

Explanatory notes

Non-citizen recipients

Posthumous recipients

References

External links
 
 

Lists of Indian award winners
2010s in India
2010s-related lists